Andel (Gallo: Andèu) is a commune in the Côtes-d'Armor department of Brittany in north-western France.

Population

Inhabitants of Andel are called Andelais in French.

See also
Communes of the Côtes-d'Armor department

References

External links

Official website  

Communes of Côtes-d'Armor